Annelies Elisabeth Verstand-Bogaert  (born 8 October 1949, Oostburg) is a Dutch politician.

See also
List of Dutch politicians

References

1949 births
Living people
State Secretaries for Social Affairs of the Netherlands
Dutch women in politics
People from Sluis
Radboud University Nijmegen alumni